Rest Your Love on Me is the forty-second studio album by American country music singer Conway Twitty. The album was released in 1980, by MCA Records.

Track listing

Charts

Weekly charts

Year-end charts

References

1980 albums
Conway Twitty albums
MCA Records albums
Albums produced by Ron Chancey